Catherine Dubosc (born 12 March 1959) is a French soprano. Born in Lille, she studied with Eric Tappy at the Opéra National de Lyon, before joining that company in 1985. She is well known for her Mozart roles, but she has also sung operas written significantly earlier (Giasone) and later (Dialogues of the Carmelites).

Recordings
Poulenc: Mélodies Dubosc with Pascal Rogé, Felicity Lott at al. Decca CD

References
Bach Cantatas biography, accessed 25 January 2010
Radio France biography, accessed 25 January 2010

1959 births
Living people
French operatic sopranos